The 2018 ITTF Men's World Cup was a table tennis competition held in Paris, France, from 19 to 21 October 2018. It was the 39th edition of the ITTF-sanctioned event, and the third time that it had been staged in Paris.

In the final, China's Fan Zhendong defeated Timo Boll of Germany, 4–1, to win his second World Cup title.

Qualification

In total, 20 players qualified for the World Cup:

 18 players from the five Continental Cups held during 2018
 A host association representative
 A wild card, selected by the ITTF

A maximum of two players from each association could qualify.

As reigning World Champion, China's Ma Long was invited to take part, but withdrew prior to the event. His place was taken by Lin Gaoyuan.

Notes

Competition format

The tournament consisted of two stages: a preliminary group stage and a knockout stage. The players seeded 9 to 20 were drawn into four groups, with three players in each group. The top two players from each group joined the top eight seeded players in the second stage of the competition, which consisted of a knockout draw.

Seeding

The seeding list was based on the official ITTF world ranking for October 2018.

Preliminary stage

The preliminary group stage took place on 19 October, with the top two players in each group progressing to the main draw.

Main draw

The knockout stage took place from 20–21 October.

See also
2018 World Team Table Tennis Championships
2018 ITTF World Tour
2018 ITTF World Tour Grand Finals
2018 ITTF Women's World Cup
2018 ITTF Team World Cup

References

External links
 Tournament page on ITTF website

Men
World Cup (men)
Table tennis competitions in France
International sports competitions hosted by Paris
ITTF Men's World Cup
ITTF Men's World Cup